Lassas is a surname. Notable people with the surname include:

Åke Lassas (1924–2009), Swedish ice hockey player 
Fredrik Lassas (born 1996), Finnish football player

See also
Lassa (disambiguation)

Surnames of Scandinavian origin